Pero Popović (1881 – 1 February 1941) was a Bosnian Serb painter.

Pero Popović was born in Prijedor, Bosnia and Herzegovina at the time part of the Austro-Hungarian Empire. After graduating from high school in Sarajevo, he went to Vienna and completed three semesters of philosophy, and then went to the Academy of Fine Arts in Prague and studied painting with Vlaho Bukovac and Czech František Ženíšek. 

Popović, with two other student colleagues Todor Švrakić and Branko Radulović, would eventually go on to organize the first exhibition of local painters in Bosnia and Herzegovina in 1907 in Sarajevo and the second one in 1910 in Prijedor. Popović was employed as an art professor at Velika Realka  gymnasium in Banja Luka in 1908. His students were Milivoj Uzelac and Vilko Gecan. He moved from Banja Luka to Sarajevo in 1930 and remained there for the rest of his life. He painted portraits, landscapes, still lifes, compositions with scenes from everyday life. He also painted icons for an iconostasis for the church in Prijedor and mosaics for the church in Banja Luka.

He transtioned from imitating Bukovac's palette with the pointillist foundations to turning a strong and contrasting coloristic expression, which approached the Seanist poetics and Gauguin. Regarding Popović's paintings, the art historian Vera Jablan writes:

"Studies of nudes and portraits, sketches from the streets and unfinished compositions sometimes show how seriously this painter approached the work. How great he had the demands of himself, in front of his artist conscience. independent of the desire and taste of the audience, uninterested in selling his works, he constantly creates."

Popović soon abandoned the pointillism and at first lazily, and then freer to the pastures, sought his own expression. His works are considered serious studies, coloristic and tonal relations. The rich scale of strong tones, bold contrasts of colors and illumination, expressive drawing and solid composition characterize his creativity, in which, with an exceptionally strong grasp of the whole, he feels the virtuoso, almost oriental finesse of details.

Popović died in Sarajevo.

References 

1881 births
1941 deaths
Bosnia and Herzegovina painters
Bosnia and Herzegovina artists
Serbs of Bosnia and Herzegovina
Serbian painters
Serbian artists